Ianis Hagi (born 22 October 1998) is a Romanian professional footballer who plays as an attacking midfielder or a forward for Scottish Premiership club Rangers and the Romania national team.

Hagi made his professional debut for Viitorul Constanța at age 16, after having trained at the academy of his father Gheorghe. He moved abroad for the first time in 2016 to Italian side Fiorentina, but only played two Serie A matches. Hagi returned to Viitorul one and a half years later and won the Cupa României, before leaving again in 2019 for Belgian team Genk. In January 2020, he joined Rangers on an initial loan which was later made permanent, and aided them to win the league the following season.

Internationally, Hagi earned his first full cap for Romania in a 3–0 UEFA Nations League win over Lithuania in November 2018. The following year, he represented the under-21 side in the European Championship, scoring twice before they were eliminated in the semi-finals.

Club career

Early career
Hagi was born in Istanbul, Turkey, where his father Gheorghe was playing for Galatasaray. He joined his namesake Gheorghe Hagi football academy in 2009, and made his Liga I debut for Viitorul Constanța at the age of 16 on 5 December 2014. He came on as a last-minute substitute for Silviu Pană in a 1–2 home defeat to FC Botoșani.

On 29 May 2015, Hagi scored his first goal as a senior, contributing to a 4–4 draw against the same opponent while also acting as a starter for the first time. In June, he gained team captaincy. Hagi scored his second league goal against ACS Poli Timișoara, in a 4–0 home win on 21 August 2015, a few days after having missed a penalty against Concordia Chiajna. In October, he was named by The Guardian as one of the 50 best young footballers in the world born in 1998.

Fiorentina
On 10 July 2016, Hagi joined Fiorentina for a €2 million transfer fee. He made his league debut on 23 October, replacing Josip Iličić late into a 5–3 away triumph over Cagliari. In April 2017, Hagi was nominated for the European Golden Boy award.

Return to Viitorul Constanța
Hagi returned to Viitorul Constanța on 18 January 2018 for a reported €2 million, with Fiorentina being entitled to 30% of a future transfer fee. In July, he was again nominated for the European Golden Boy award. During his second spell at his father's team, he scored 20 goals in 53 matches across all competitions. He won his first career trophy on 25 May 2019, after Viitorul defeated Astra Giurgiu 2–1 in the Cupa României final.

Genk

On 12 July 2019, Belgian defending champions Genk announced the signing of Hagi on a five-year contract. The transfer fee was variously reported as €4 million, €8 million with performance bonuses included, or €10 million for 85% of the players's economic rights plus bonuses. Viitorul executive president Gheorghe Popescu confirmed the club retained interest on the capital gain of a potential future transfer.

On 26 July 2019, in the Belgian First Division A opening fixture, Hagi made his debut by coming off the bench and scoring the winner in a 2–1 victory over Kortrijk. He recorded his next goals on 28 September against Sint-Truiden, netting both from the penalty spot but with different legs, and also assisted Théo Bongonda in the 3–3 draw. He played in five of Genk's group stage matches in the UEFA Champions League, as his side finished fourth behind Liverpool, Napoli and Red Bull Salzburg respectively.

Rangers
Hagi joined Scottish Premiership club Rangers on a six-month loan with an option to buy on 31 January 2020. The following day, he made his first appearance for the club as a substitute in a goalless draw with Aberdeen. On 5 February, Hagi started and scored the winner in a 2–1 success over Hibernian, while 15 days later he scored twice against Braga in the UEFA Europa League as  his side won 3–2. In late May 2020, Rangers announced that they had signed Hagi permanently from Genk on a long-term contract.

Rangers went on to win the Scottish Premiership title at the end of the following season. Individually, Hagi also won the Scottish Premiership Playmaker of the Season award for most assists (11 assists) in the 2020–21 season. On 17 May 2021, Hagi won Rangers Young Player of the Year.

In 2021–22, Hagi contributed one goal to Rangers' run to the 2022 UEFA Europa League Final, coming off the bench to equalise in a 1–1 group draw at Brøndby IF on 4 November. On 21 January 2022, he was substituted after 15 minutes of a cup game against Stirling Albion, and was ruled out for the rest of the season due to a severe knee injury which required surgery. He returned on 28 January the following year as a 72nd-minute substitute in a 2–0 home win over St Johnstone.

International career
Hagi represented Romania at under-15, under-16, under-17, under-18, under-19 and under-21 levels. On 11 September 2018, he scored a direct corner kick in a 2–0 win over the Bosnia and Herzegovina under-21 team. Two months later, Hagi made his senior debut for Romania in a 3–0 UEFA Nations League win over Lithuania, coming on as a 68th-minute substitute for Claudiu Keșerü.

He was part of the team that qualified for the second time in their history for the UEFA European Under-21 Championship, starting in all three group matches of the 2019 final tournament in Italy. He netted one each against Croatia and England to help his side progress to the semi-finals as group winners, where they lost 2–4 to defending champions Germany.

Hagi scored his first senior international goal on 25 March 2021, after coming on as a substitute to decide a 3–2 home win over North Macedonia in the 2022 FIFA World Cup qualification.

Style of play
Considered to be a promising young talent, Hagi's playing style has drawn comparisons with that of his father's due to his dribbling skills, passing, two-footedness and playmaking ability. His preferred role is that of an attacking midfielder, and he is regarded as a quick, agile and versatile player.

Hagi is also capable of playing in several advanced roles, and has been used as a winger, a second striker or even a centre-forward on occasion. Due to his vision, technique and eye for goal, he is both capable of creating chances for his teammates and scoring goals himself.

Personal life
Hagi has an elder sister, Kira, who is an actress. Their father Gheorghe is of Aromanian descent, and met their mother Marilena in 1993. Gheorghe was playing for Brescia at the time, while the latter was a second-year college student.

Hagi has been sponsored by Nike apparel since his early career. In 2019, he provided the Romanian dubbing for Victor Frankenstein in the Disney animation movie Frankenweenie.

Career statistics

Club

International

Scores and results list Romania's goal tally first, score column indicates score after each Hagi goal.

Honours
Viitorul Constanța
Cupa României: 2018–19

Genk
Belgian Super Cup: 2019

Rangers
Scottish Premiership: 2020–21
 UEFA Europa League runner-up: 2021–22

Individual
Liga I Team of the Season: 2017–18, 2018–19
Rangers Young Player of the Year: 2020–21

References

External links

Profile at the Rangers F.C. website

1998 births
Living people
Footballers from Istanbul
Romanian footballers
Romanian people of Aromanian descent
Aromanian sportspeople
Association football midfielders
Association football wingers
Liga I players
FC Viitorul Constanța players
Serie A players
ACF Fiorentina players
Belgian Pro League players
K.R.C. Genk players
Scottish Professional Football League players
Rangers F.C. players
Romania youth international footballers
Romania international footballers
Romania under-21 international footballers
Romanian expatriate footballers
Expatriate footballers in Italy
Expatriate footballers in Belgium
Expatriate footballers in Scotland
Romanian expatriate sportspeople in Italy
Romanian expatriate sportspeople in Belgium
Romanian expatriate sportspeople in Scotland
Turkish people of Romanian descent